Koukouli may refer to:

Koukouli, Patras, a district of Patras city, Greece
Koukouli, Ioannina, a village in the Ioannina regional unit, Greece
Koukouli, Preveza, a village in the Preveza regional unit, Greece
Koukoulion, a traditional headdress worn by monks in the Eastern Orthodox Church